Viceroy is a hamlet in Excel Rural Municipality No. 71, Saskatchewan, Canada. The population was 25 at the 2011 Census. The hamlet previously held the status of a village until May 10, 2002. Viceroy is located 7 km south of the historic Red Coat Trail on Highway 624 north of Willow Bunch Lake adjacent to Big Muddy Valley.

History 
Viceroy was incorporated in 1912. At its peak in the 1950s it had a population of 250. Prior to May 10, 2002, Viceroy was incorporated as a village, and was restructured as a hamlet under the jurisdiction of the Rural municipality of Excel on that date.

Demographics 

Services 
Once a bustling community with two schools, two restaurants, Klemenz Poolroom and bowling alley, a theatre and many other businesses. After two fires in the past century the community has shrunk to a much smaller scale. Viceroy still boasts the Viceroy Co-op which in a sense is the local "general store" offering grocery staples, tools, feed, hardware, parts, auto repair and petroleum sales.

The RM of Excel No. 71, office is located on main street with the equipment yard/shop to the south. Bengough Credit Union also operates a branch in Viceroy.

See also 
 List of communities in Saskatchewan
 Hamlets of Saskatchewan

References 

Designated places in Saskatchewan
Excel No. 71, Saskatchewan
Former villages in Saskatchewan
Hamlets in Saskatchewan
Populated places established in 1912
Populated places disestablished in 2002
1912 establishments in Saskatchewan
Division No. 3, Saskatchewan